Dâmbovița can refer to these places in Romania:

 Dâmbovița County
 Dâmbovița (river)
 Dâmbovița Center, an unfinished Romanian building in Bucharest, near Cotroceni